Kochev (also appearing in the transliteration variants Kočev, Kocheff, Kotcheff or Kotschew) – with its female form Kocheva – is a Bulgarian and Macedonian surname which is derived from the male given name Kocho, a shortened version of the Bulgarian given name Nikolai/Nikolay that stems from the Greek name Nicholas, meaning "victor of the people." 

Notable people with the name Kochev/Kotcheff include:

Krasimir Kochev (born 1974), Bulgarian freestyle wrestler
Mariya Kocheva (born 1974), retired Bulgarian backstroke swimmer
Ted Kotcheff (born 1931), Bulgarian-Canadian film and television director and producer
Vasil Kochev (born 1988), Bulgarian footballer

References

Macedonian-language surnames
Bulgarian-language surnames